They Call It Sin is a 1932 American pre-Code drama film directed by Thornton Freeland and starring Loretta Young as a farmer's daughter who follows a traveling salesman to New York City, only to discover he already is engaged.

Plot
Small-town church organist Marion Cullen (Loretta Young) falls in love with traveling salesman Jimmy Decker (David Manners). When she learns that the couple who raised her are not really her parents, and that she is actually the illegitimate daughter of a showgirl, she sets out for New York City in search of Jimmy. However, she discovers that he is engaged to Enid Hollister (Helen Vinson), his boss' daughter. Dr. Travers (George Brent), who is in love with Marion, offers to help her, but she decides to try to make it on her own.

Jobs are scarce, however. She ends up with other hopeful showgirls, among them Dixie Dare (Una Merkel), hoping to audition for a part in Ford Humphries' new production. The philandering Humphries likes what he sees in Marion and hires her as a piano accompanist. Dixie gets a job as well, and she and Marion become friends and roommates.

Travers sees Humphries and Marion together, and knowing the former's reputation, brings Jimmy to Humphries' party. Jimmy tells Marion that he loves her, but she refuses to break up his marriage. When she also refuses Humphries' advances, he fires her. He then decides to use one of the songs she had composed for his production, claiming he wrote it. When she learns of this, she confronts him, although he denies everything. Jimmy goes to Humphries' suite to convince him to do the right thing. During their argument, Humphries stumbles and falls onto the balcony below and lapses into a coma from his injuries. Jimmy flees the scene; however, the police have a description of him and suspect him of attempted murder. To shield Jimmy, Marion confesses to the non-existent crime. Desperate, Travers operates for hours on Humphries, who regains consciousness and explains what really happened in front of witnesses before dying. Marion is released and becomes engaged to Travers, as Jimmy wishes them well.

Cast
 Loretta Young as Marion Cullen
 George Brent as Dr. Travers
 Una Merkel as Dixie Dare
 David Manners as Jimmy Decker
 Helen Vinson as Enid Hollister
 Louis Calhern as Ford Humphries
 Joseph Cawthorn as Mr. Hollister (credited as Joe Cawthorne)
 Nella Walker as Mrs. Hollister
 Elizabeth Patterson as Mrs. Cullen
 Erville Alderson as Mr. Cullen
 Roscoe Karns as Brandt (uncredited)

Reception
Mordaunt Hall, reviewer for The New York Times, dismissed it as an "unimportant offering ... weighted down with more or less stereotyped sensational episodes, none of which adds one iota of lifelike quality to the production", although the "back-stage episodes are produced neatly and with a praiseworthy degree of imagination in the direction." He did, however, praise several of the principal actors: "Miss Young is charming as Marion, but she has to share the acting laurels with Miss Merkel, who makes the most of her every line...George Brent does quite well as Tony."

References

External links
 
 
 
 

American romantic drama films
American black-and-white films
Films based on American novels
Films directed by Thornton Freeland
Films set in New York City
First National Pictures films
1932 romantic drama films
1932 films
1930s American films